Mark Nelson (born September 26, 1955) is an American actor, director and teacher.  He appeared on Broadway in Angels in America, The Invention of Love, After the Fall and Three Sisters at Roundabout Theatre Company, and the original casts of A Few Good Men, Rumors, Biloxi Blues and Amadeus.  For his performance as Einstein in Steve Martin's Picasso at the Lapin Agile he received the Obie, Drama League, Carbonell and San Francisco Critics Awards.  He played Herr Schultz in the 2016 national tour of Cabaret and acted off-Broadway in My Name is Asher Lev for which he received a Lortel nomination. Other roles include Shylock in The Merchant of Venice at The Shakespeare Theater, Uncle Vanya (in Bartlett Sher's production at the Intiman Theatre), Matt in Talley's Folly (Berkshire Theatre Festival), Bluntschli in Arms and the Man (Long Wharf Theatre) and two solo pieces: I Am My Own Wife by Doug Wright (Carbonell Award) and Underneath the Lintel by Glen Berger (Connecticut Critics Award). His TV work includes roles on Unforgettable, Law & Order and Spin City. He teaches acting at Princeton University and at New York City's HB Studio. He has directed at Manhattan Theatre Club, Drama Dept., McCarter Theatre, George Street Playhouse, and Chautauqua Theatre Company, and is a frequent guest director at the Juilliard School. He graduated from Princeton and then studied acting with Uta Hagen. In 2013 he received a Lunt-Fontanne Fellowship.

Filmography

References

External links
 
 

Living people
Princeton University alumni
Place of birth missing (living people)
American male actors
1955 births